Paisa Paisa may refer to:
Paisa Paisa (2017 film), a 2017 Telugu film
 Paisa Paisa (2016 film),  a film directed by Joji Raechal Job
 Paisa Paisa (2013 film), a 2013 Malayalam film
 "Paisa Paisa" (2009 song), the theme song for the 2009 Bollywood film De Dana Dan
 "Paisa Paisa" (2007 song), a song from the Tamil version of the 2007 film Guru
 "Paisa Paisa", a song by Suzanne D'Mello and Hamza Faruqui in the 2006 Hindi film Apna Sapna Money Money
 "Paisa Paisa", a 2002 Punjabi song by Daler Mehndi from Nach Ni Shaam Kaure

See also
 Paisa Yeh Paisa, a 1985 Indian Bollywood film
 "Paisa Hai Power", a song by Dibyendu Mukherjee from the 2009 film Aa Dekhen Zara